i-Team (the Internet Team / The Internet Cyclists' Club) is a non-commercial cycling club, affiliated to British Cycling, Cycling Time Trials, Surrey League. i-Team is Go-Ride accredited and its members organise the weekly Portsmouth School of Cycle Racing, helping young riders develop and progress in the sport of cycling.

i-Team's mission is to offer an accessible and friendly gateway into the world of club cycling and pool knowledge, information and resources, to help members progress their cycling as far as they want to go. i-Team was founded by Guy Watson with 10 members from the Portsmouth Area in 2003 and membership now includes around 150 cyclists throughout the U. K. and Worldwide.

Hall of Fame and former members
 Club President - Rob Hayles
 2012 Olympic Gold Medalist - Dani King
 2012 Junior World Silver Medalist - Jon Dibben

Cycling clubs in the United Kingdom